Ville Räsänen (born 8 October 1998) is a Finnish professional ice hockey player who is currently an unrestricted free agent. He most recently played in his native Finland for Jokipojat of the Mestis. He was selected by the Carolina Hurricanes in the seventh round, 197th overall, in the 2017 NHL Entry Draft.

Career statistics

References

External links

 

1998 births
Living people
Carolina Hurricanes draft picks
Chicago Steel players
Finnish ice hockey defencemen
Finnish expatriate ice hockey players in the United States
Jokipojat players
Lincoln Stars players
Mikkelin Jukurit players
People from Joensuu
Rovaniemen Kiekko players
Sportspeople from North Karelia